Hingula may refer to:

 Hingula, a synonym of the moth genus Rhesala
 Hingula, Sri Lanka, a town in Sri Lanka